Cardine Banca S.p.A. was an Italian banking group that operated between 2000 and 2002. It was acquired by Sanpaolo IMI an banking and insurance conglomerate.

History
The bank was founded in 2000 by the merger of Casse Emiliano Romagnole and Casse Venete Banca. On 1 June 2002 the group was acquired by Sanpaolo IMI in an all shares deal.

In 2000 Banca Agricola di Gorizia was sold to Banca Popolare di Cividale.

In 2002, the European Investment Bank advanced a €200.37 million loan to the banking group, as part of a subsidized loan to small and medium-sized enterprises and small and medium-sized infrastructure projects.

Subsidiaries
product company
 Cardine Leasing
 Finemiro Leasing
 Cardine Fiduciaria
 retail banks
 Banca Agricola di Cerea
 Banca Popolare dell'Adriatico
 Cassa di Risparmio di Gorizia
 Cassa di Risparmio di Padova e Rovigo (Cariparo)
 Cassa di Risparmio di Udine e Pordenone (CRUP)
 Cassa di Risparmio di Venezia
 Cassa di Risparmio in Bologna (Carisbo)
 Finemiro Banca
 FarBanca
 West Bank S.A.

References

 
Sanpaolo IMI acquisitions
Defunct banks of Italy
Italian companies established in 2000
Banks established in 2000
Italian companies disestablished in 2002
Banks disestablished in 2002